Ángel Etcheverry is a locality in La Plata Partido, in the Buenos Aires Province of Argentina . It is located 16 km southwest of the La Plata city center. It is connected to the city thanks to Provincial Route 215 and connected to Buenos Aires through Provincial Route 2.

Notes and references

Populated places in Buenos Aires Province
La Plata Partido